A by-election was held in the Dáil Éireann Cork North-Central constituency in Ireland on 10 November 1994. It followed the death of Labour Party Teachta Dála (TD) Gerry O'Sullivan on 5 August 1994.

The election was won by Cork City Councillor and future Minister of State Kathleen Lynch. It was the second and final time Democratic Left would ever win a by-election.

Among the candidates were Senator Billy Kelleher, who would later serve as a TD, Minister of State and MEP, Colm Burke who would also go on to serve as Senator, TD and MEP, Cork County Councillor Michael Burns and Cork City Councillors Jimmy Homan and Con O'Leary.

On the same day, a by-election took place in Cork South-Central.

Result

See also
List of Dáil by-elections
Dáil constituencies

References

External links
https://www.electionsireland.org/result.cfm?election=1992B&cons=57&ref=111
http://irelandelection.com/election.php?elecid=40&constitid=7&electype=2

1994 in Irish politics
27th Dáil
By-elections in the Republic of Ireland
Elections in County Cork
November 1994 events in Europe
1994 elections in the Republic of Ireland